The Daily Nation is the highest circulation Kenyan independent newspaper with 170,000 copies.

History

The Daily Nation was started in the year 1958 as a Swahili weekly called Taifa  by the Englishman Charles Hayes. It was bought in 1959 by the Aga Khan, and became a daily newspaper, Taifa Leo (Swahili for "Nation Today"), in January 1960. An English language edition called Daily Nation was published on 3 October 1960, in a process organised by former editor of the British News Chronicle, Michael Curtis. The publisher was East African Newspapers (Nation Series) Ltd, which later became the Nation Media Group with operations throughout the African Great Lakes region.

The newspaper is published by Nation Media Group from its headquarters at Nation Centre on Kimathi Street in Nairobi. It also maintains a website, which hosts online editions of the daily and Sunday titles. Access is partially free and the site's daily hit rate is more than three million. A 55-minute colour documentary film about the paper was released in 2000, directed by Hillie Molenaar and Joop van Wijk.

Market share
The Daily Nation and its Sunday edition paper Sunday Nation had a market share of 53% in 2011. Their market share was 74% in 2013. Their main competitors are The Standard, published by the Standard Group, The Star, published by the Radio Africa Group and People Daily, published by MediaMax Limited.

Affiliated newspapers
 The Saturday Nation
 The Sunday Nation
 Business Daily Africa
 Taifa Leo, a Swahili-language newspaper, Kenya
 Daily Monitor Uganda
 The Citizen (Tanzania)
 The EastAfrican Newspapers

Features

References

External links
 

Newspapers published in Kenya
Nation Media Group
1958 establishments in Kenya
Publications established in 1958
Mass media in Nairobi